John Beke, STB  was an Oxford college head in the 15th-century.

Beke was appointed Rector of Lincoln College, Oxford in 1635.

References

Rectors of Lincoln College, Oxford
15th-century English people